Katy Hessel is a British art historian, broadcaster, writer and curator, living in London, whose work is concerned with women artists.

Life and work
Hessel was born and raised in London. She attended Westminster School. She studied art history at University College London.

She writes on the subject of women artists for various publications. She has written and presented the BBC arts documentaries Artemisia Gentileschi (2020) and Art on the BBC: Monet (2022). 
Hessel has hosted Dior Talks: Feminist Art 
She runs the Great Women Artists Instagram account and in 2019 created a podcast by the same name in which she interviews art historians, art curators, writers, and art lovers about women artists and also talks to women artists about their work and career. In September 2022, Hessel published the book The Story of Art without Men, a 500-year survey of art by women from the 1500s to 2020s.  It won the 2022 Waterstones Book of the Year. The book has been criticised for ignoring 50 years of feminist scholarship: 'The fact that Hessel’s project takes for its centre of gravity a concept so deeply rooted in white supremacy and patriarchy speaks to a lack of critical engagement with feminist histories and historiography. […] the ‘corrective’ approach to art history on display here, with its hyped-up narratives of ‘rediscovery’, is underpinned by a regressive girl-boss feminism that basically just wants women to have more shows at Gagosian and sell for more money at Sotheby’s. This is a feminism that superficially gestures in the direction of diversity and inclusivity without understanding the ways in which intersectional frameworks demand fundamentally different ways of doing things.'  Also in 2022 she became a curatorial trustee of Charleston.

Publications
The Story of Art without Men. London: Penguin, 2022. .

Awards
2021: Forbes 30 Under 30 in Art & Culture
2022: Winner of Waterstones Book of the Year for The Story of Art Without Men

References

External links
Hessel's bio on the Great Women Artists site

21st-century English writers
21st-century English women writers
British women podcasters
Alumni of University College London
People from London
Living people
1990s births
Year of birth missing (living people)